Charles Edward Allen Diering (February 5, 1923 – November 23, 2012) was an American professional baseball player who appeared in 752 games in Major League Baseball as outfielder and third baseman over all or part of nine seasons between  and  for the St. Louis Cardinals, New York Giants and Baltimore Orioles.

Born in St. Louis, Diering attended Beaumont High School and began his pro career in the Cardinals' organization in 1941, then missed the 1943–1945 seasons performing World War II service in the United States Army.

Diering returned to baseball in 1946, and made the Cardinals' roster at the outset of the 1947 season. But he didn't win a regular job until , when he was the Redbirds' starting center fielder, batting a career-high .263 in 131 games played. He was traded to the Giants with Max Lanier for Eddie Stanky on December 11, 1951. He hit only .174 in sparse duty for the  Giants, and spent much of that campaign and all of 1953 with Triple-A Minneapolis. 

He was selected the club's first-ever Most Valuable Player in 1954. After playing his final game as an Oriole on June 24, 1956, as a defensive replacement against the Detroit Tigers at Briggs Stadium, he continued his pro career in the minor leagues into 1957.

In his 752-game, nine-season major league tenure, Diering collected 411 hits, with 76 doubles, 14 triples and 14 home runs. He batted .249 lifetime with 141 runs batted in.

After his playing days were over, Diering owned a car dealership in Alton, Illinois. He died in Spanish Lake, Missouri, at 89 on November 23, 2012.

References

External links

1923 births
2012 deaths
Albany Cardinals players
Baltimore Orioles players
Baseball players from St. Louis
Daytona Beach Islanders players
Major League Baseball outfielders
Minneapolis Millers (baseball) players
Montreal Royals players
New York Giants (NL) players
Omaha Cardinals players
Rochester Red Wings players
St. Louis Cardinals players
United States Army personnel of World War II
Vancouver Mounties players